General elections were held in Malta on 11 and 12 October 1909. For the first time since 1895, all seats were contested.

Background
The elections were held under the Chamberlain Constitution, with members elected from eight single-member constituencies.

Results
A total of 7,377 people were registered to vote, with 3,354 votes cast, giving a turnout of 46%.

References

General elections in Malta
Malta
General
Malta
Malta